Akiva Nof (born 2 December 1936) is an Israeli poet and songwriter, composer,  politician, lawyer and a journalist, who served three terms as a member of the Knesset between 1974 and 1984.

Biography
Nof was born Akiva Naparstek' in Tel Aviv during the Mandate era. He studied international relations, Middle Eastern studies and law at the Hebrew University of Jerusalem. He was certified as a lawyer, and also studied at the Institute of Social Studies in The Hague.

Political career
Having joined Herut, he became chairman of the party's youth leadership. In 1965 he left the party to establish the Free Centre, serving as its secretary and organisational co-ordinator between 1967 and 1969. He was elected to the Knesset on the Likud list (an alliance of Herut, the Liberal Party, the Free Centre, the National List and the Movement for Greater Israel) in 1973. On 26 October 1976 he and Shmuel Tamir left Likud to establish the Free Centre as an independent faction. Both resigned from the Knesset on 22 January 1977, with Nof being replaced by Amal Nasser el-Din.

Having joined the new Democratic Movement for Change in 1977, Nof returned to the Knesset following the May 1977 elections. When the party split in 1978 he joined the Democratic Movement, before defecting to Ahva on 17 September 1980. On 28 January the following year he returned to Likud, and was re-elected on its list in the elections later that year. He lost his seat in the 1984 elections.

During his three terms in the Knesset, Nof served, among other duties, as the chairman of the forming committee for the  "Israeli Law Courts" bill. He was prominent in legislative initiatives regarding social issues such as  retirees' fair pay, gender equality regarding children's custody of divorced couples, smoking prohibition in public spaces, correction of taxation inconsistencies, prevention of marriage of minors, as well as prevention of corruption in public enterprises. He also served as a member of public boards of directors, such as the Seniors' Services Association, the Bible Museum, Independence House and the Haifa Symphony. Nof also served as an internal adjudicator at the Histadrut, at the Legal Bar Association and at the Composers and Writers Association. By filing lawsuits, Nof instigated some principle-setting court rulings, such as mandatory provision for handicap access to entertainment venues, prohibition of political censorship of works of art broadcast on radio and television.

Music and writing
Nof composed and wrote popular songs and hits for leading performers including HaGashash HaHiver. His song Izevel (about Jezebel) was a number one hit in 1972. As a student in the Netherlands in the 1960s, while working as a freelance reporter for Kol Israel, Nof interviewed John Lennon and Yoko Ono during their Bed-In. At the end of the interview, Lennon sang a verse from Nof's song Oath for Jerusalem, which Nof transcribed for him into Latin characters.

Nof has published two poetry and song books titled Longing For The Past, and Pleasure Comes For Ever.

References

External links

Akiva Nov performing his song: Izevel

1936 births
People from Tel Aviv
Israeli Jews
Jews in Mandatory Palestine
Hebrew University of Jerusalem alumni
Israeli lawyers
Living people
Ahva (political party) politicians
Democratic Movement (Israel) politicians
Democratic Movement for Change politicians
Free Centre politicians
Likud politicians
Members of the 8th Knesset (1974–1977)
Members of the 9th Knesset (1977–1981)
Members of the 10th Knesset (1981–1984)